Grant Township is a township in Hardin County, Iowa, USA.

History
Grant Township was organized in 1868. It is named for Ulysses S. Grant.

References

Townships in Hardin County, Iowa
Townships in Iowa
1868 establishments in Iowa